Cargo 200 (Gruz dvésti) is a military code word used in the Soviet Union and the post-Soviet states referring to the transportation of military fatalities. Officially, the term Cargo 200 is military jargon to refer specifically to the corpses of soldiers contained in zinc-lined coffins for air transportation. Unofficially, Cargo 200 is used to refer to all bodies of the dead being transported away from the battlefield, and has also become a euphemism for irreversible losses of manpower in a conflict.

Origins
The first appearance of Cargo 200 is unknown, except that it came into use in the mid-1980s during the Soviet–Afghan War. The term saw widespread use in the Soviet military by the late 1980s, spawning the related code words Cargo 300 for the transportation of wounded personnel, and Cargo 100 for the transportation of munitions.

Modern usage
The term Cargo 200 has received new international attention since the start of the Russian invasion of Ukraine in 2014. , the OSCE Special Monitoring Mission has after two and a half years, despite their limited access to the Donbas war conflict zone, counted more than 20 vehicles with a “Cargo 200” inscription used to transport bodies of deceased Russian mercenaries and soldiers from Donbas. Cargo 200 was referenced by the Ukrainian Ministry of Internal Affairs in the name of their 200rf.com website used to publicize Russian personnel killed and captured during the 2022 Russian invasion of Ukraine.

Related military code words
Cargo 100: ammunition
Cargo 300: wounded
Cargo 400: concussion or captured
Cargo 500: medicines
Cargo 600: oversized cargo
Cargo 700: cash
Cargo 800: "special" or chemical weapons

See also
 Cargo 200 (2007 film)
 Zachistka

References 

Code names
Military slang and jargon
Military of the Soviet Union